Karawara is a suburb of Perth, Western Australia. In 2016 census, the total population was at 2,061.

History
Formerly the southern portion of the Collier Pine Plantation, Karawara is an Aboriginal word meaning green. The suburb name was approved in 1973.

Geography
The suburb is bounded by the Collier Park Golf Course to the north, Kent Street and Curtin University to the east, Manning Road to the south and the Curtin Primary School (formerly known as Koonawarra Primary School) to the west.

References

Suburbs of Perth, Western Australia
Suburbs in the City of South Perth